Ernest Peter McMaster (7 October 1887 – 5 December 1971) was an Australian rules footballer who played with Melbourne in the Victorian Football League (VFL).

Family
The son of Peter Bain McMaster (1859-1924), and Alice Amelia McMaster (1862-1940), née Furmedge, Ernest Peter McMaster was born at Hotham, Victoria on 7 October 1887.

He married Ada Beatrice Clara Dickinson (1893-1966) in 1915.

Football

Melbourne (VFL)
He was cleared from Footscray to Melbourne in April 1910.

Death
He died in Glen Iris, Victoria on 5 December 1971.

Notes

References

External links 

 
Ernie McMaster at Demonwiki

1887 births
1971 deaths
Australian rules footballers from Melbourne
Melbourne Football Club players
People from North Melbourne